Modica is a city and comune of 54,456 inhabitants in the Province of Ragusa, Sicily, southern Italy.  The city is situated in the Hyblaean Mountains.

Modica has neolithic origins and it represents the historical capital of the area which today almost corresponds to the Province of Ragusa. Until the 19th century it was the capital of a County that exercised such a wide political, economical and cultural influence to be counted among the most powerful feuds of the Mezzogiorno.

Rebuilt following the devastating earthquake of 1693, its architecture has been recognised as providing outstanding testimony to the exuberant genius and final flowering of Baroque art in Europe and, along with other towns in the Val di Noto, is part of UNESCO Heritage Sites in Italy.

History
According to Thucydides, the city was founded in 1360 BC or 1031 BC and was inhabited by the Sicels in the 7th century BC. It was probably a dependency of Syracuse. Modica was occupied by the Romans after the battle of the Egadi islands against the Carthaginians in the Punic Wars 241 BC, together with Syracuse and all of Sicily.  Modica became one of the thirty-five decuman ("spontaneously submitted") cities of the island and was oppressed by the praetor Verres. It became an independent municipium, and apparently a place of some consequence. The city is also mentioned among the inland towns of the island both by Pliny and Ptolemy; and though its name is not found in the Itineraries, it is again mentioned by the Geographer of Ravenna. Silius Italicus also includes it in his list of Sicilian cities, and immediately associates it with Netum (now Noto Antica), with which it was clearly in the same neighborhood. The southeast of Sicily and Modica (according to the German historian L. Hertling) was rapidly Christianized, as the diocese of Syracuse boasts an apostolic foundation by St. Paul in 61 AD. In 535, the Byzantine general Belisarius expelled the Ostrogoths and established for Justinian I the government of the East-Roman Empire (also known as the Byzantine Empire) and the already Greek-speaking population fixed their culture until the Latinization of the Normans in the 11th century.

In 845, Modica was captured by the Arabs during the Muslim conquest of Sicily. They referred to the city as Mudiqah. The year after its capture, the Arabs fortified its citadels and it subsequently prospered under their rule. In 1091 the conquest of Modica and the entire Val di Noto ended the long lasting war of the Normans, led by Roger of Hauteville, against the Arabs.

In 1296, Modica became the capital of an important county, which under the Chiaramonte family became a flourishing semi-independent state controlling the whole southern third of the island, with the right of a mint of its own and other privileges (see County of Modica).

On Assumption day 15 August 1474, Christians wreaked brutal havoc on the Jewish dwellers of the Cartellone area of Modica, the so-called "Strage dell'Assunta" (massacre of the assumption). This episode was the first and most horrible antisemitic massacre of Sicilian Israelites. During the evening a number of Christians (fomented by fanatic Catholic preachers inspired by the inquisitorial repression) slaughtered about 360 innocents causing a total and fierce devastation in La Giudecca.  The incitement that echoed through the streets was: "Hurrah for Mary! Death to the Jews!" (Viva Maria! Morte ai Giudei!).

Later, the earthquake of 1693 destroyed the entire Val di Noto, and to a slightly lesser extent in Modica.
Annexed to Italy in 1860, Modica remained district capital until 1926, when it was included in the province of Ragusa.

Landmarks

Modica consists of two urban centres, "Modica Alta" (Upper Modica) and "Modica Bassa" (Lower Modica). The older upper part is perched on the rocky top of the southern Ibeli hill, the lower part is built on the lower slopes and valley below. The walk down from Modica Alta to Modica Bassa reveals vistas of the lower town and involves many steps; not many attempt the reverse journey on foot.

Despite being ravaged by earthquakes in 1613 and 1693, and floods in 1833 and 1902, Modica has retained some of the most beautiful architecture in Sicily. Much of the city was rebuilt after the 1693 earthquake with imposing and conspicuous urban monuments in the Sicilian Baroque style.

San Giorgio is the cathedral, dedicated to St George. While the cathedral was rebuilt in a Baroque-style following the earthquake of 1693, like many other parts of the city its roots are in the Middle Ages. From the front of the Cathedral a staircase of 300 steps leads down towards Modica Bassa.

Other sights include:Castello dei Conti (Castle)Chiesa del CarmineChurch of St. Mary of Betlehem
Garibaldi Theater
Mercedari Palace -contains a museum and library

Economy
The economy of the area once principally agricultural producing olives, carobs, legumes, cereals, and cattle; an extraordinary and unique product is the famous chocolate of Modica, produced with an ancient and original Aztec recipe. The city has now been joined by factories producing textiles, furniture and cars. Tourism is also an important industry to the area, since Modica became a UNESCO World Heritage Site in 2002.

Culture
The eighteenth century saw Modica in the role of art and culture town, counting philosophers (Tommaso Campailla), poets (Girolama Grimaldi Lorefice), a school of medicine (Campailla, Gaspare Cannata, Michele Gallo, the Polara family) and literary academies among its inhabitants. In the nineteenth century, feudalism was abolished and Modica became a "bourgeois" town peopled by notables such as the writer and anthropologist Serafino Amabile Guastella, the agronomist Clemente Grimaldi, the musician Pietro Floridia and many painters, historians and other intellectuals.

Modica was also the birthplace of writer Salvatore Quasimodo, recipient of the Nobel Prize for Literature in 1959.

See also
County of Modica
History of Sicily
Sicilian Baroque
Cioccolato di Modica

References

Sources

External links

 Visit Modica: Tourism Portal for the visitors to the city of Modica
 Visit Modica: Tourismusportal für Besucher der Modica 
 Modica online 
 Motyca Smith, William ed., Dictionary of Greek and Roman Dictionary.'' London: John Murray.

 
Hilltowns in Sicily
Municipalities of the Province of Ragusa
Sicilian Baroque
Castles in Italy
Populated places established in the 2nd millennium BC
World Heritage Sites in Italy
Medieval anti-Jewish pogroms
Massacres in Italy